The Harrison cider apple is one of the most famous 18th-century American cider apples, primarily used for the production of apple cider. Grown in New Jersey before and after the American Revolution, it became obsolete by the 20th century. The Harrison cider apple was considered lost until it was recovered in Livingston, New Jersey at an old cider mill in September 1976.

Historical description

William Coxe, the first American to publish an illustrated book on the already enormous variety of fruits being grown in North America following the American Revolution, described the Harrison Cider Apple in 1817:

The breeding stock for apples, pears, cherries, plums, and peaches that has become the source of contemporary pome fruits in North America was set in place and fully described in Coxe's book. While most of these fruit varieties or their parents arrived from Europe, Coxe advocated growing the new American varieties derived from the European ones, since they showed themselves to be better adapted to the American climate and soils.

When S.A. Beach  wrote "The Apples of New York" in 1905, no mention of the Harrison was made, as it had slipped into obsolescence by the 20th century. The chief cause of this obsolescence was the growing momentum of the temperance movement throughout the United States, beginning in the 1820s.

Contemporary history
In September 1976, a fruit variety collector from Vermont went in search of the Harrison and Campfield Cider Apples in the neighborhood of Orange Mountain in Essex County, New Jersey that Coxe had written about in 1817. On September 25, he discovered an old cider mill in Livingston, New Jersey (Nettie Ochs Cider Mill on Old Short Hills Road, no longer in existence). The owner had a 'Harrison' apple tree in his backyard, which, according to the owner, had been planted by his grandfather at the turn of the century. This tree was about to be cut down to make room for an expanding vegetable garden; and it was cut down less than one week later. The tree was full of small yellow apples matching Coxe's description. The suckers Coxe had described were also present. Scions were cut and stored for the winter. In the spring of 1977, dozens of Alnarp #2 seedling rootstocks were topworked with the 'Harrison' cider apple.

In 1980, the recent recovery of the 'Harrison' and 'Campfield' cider apples in Livingston and Roseland, New Jersey was shared with Lew Nichols and Annie Proulx in Vershire, Vermont.

In the fall of 1992, trees, fruit, and scions of the Harrison Cider Apple, from the 1976 Livingston, New Jersey discovery, were sent  from Vermont to Thomas Burford of Virginia, a respected nurseryman and expert on heirloom apples. 

Subsequently, the Harrison Cider Apple has become widely available. Ironbound Hard Cider uses Harrison cider apples to produce its product on 108 acres in Asbury, New Jersey, about 50 miles west of Newark.

References
by

External links
Lost & Found - the rediscovery of the historical Harrison Cider Apple
Slow Food USA

Apple cultivars
Agriculture in New Jersey
American apples
Cider apples